Ramiro Prudencio Cortés Molteni (1931 – 23 April 1977) was a Uruguayan basketball player who competed in the 1956 Summer Olympics. He was born in Salto in 1931 and died there in 1977.

References

External links

1931 births
1977 deaths
Uruguayan men's basketball players
1959 FIBA World Championship players
Olympic basketball players of Uruguay
Basketball players at the 1956 Summer Olympics
Olympic bronze medalists for Uruguay
Olympic medalists in basketball
Medalists at the 1956 Summer Olympics
Date of birth missing
Sportspeople from Salto, Uruguay